Domingos da Cunha (c. 1598 – 11 May 1644), was a Portuguese painter.

Da Cunha, also known as the "Cabrinha" (due to being a mulatto), studied painting in Madrid with Eugenio Caxés. He primarily painted religious-themed works. He painted The Life of St. Ignatius of Loyola for the New Cathedral of Coimbra, and Visitation for Igreja de São Mamede. In March 1632 he became a lay brother Jesuit. By order of his superiors he wrote an autobiography titled Life of Brother Domingos Cunha.

References
 Big Book of Portuguese 
 Great Universal Encyclopedia (vol. 6) 
 Encyclopedia Larrousse (vol. 6) 

1598 births
1644 deaths
Portuguese painters
Portuguese male painters
Clergy from Lisbon
17th-century Portuguese Jesuits